SS Kilkenny was a passenger vessel built for the City of Dublin Steam Packet Company in 1903.

History

The ship was built by the Clyde Shipbuilding Company in Port Glasgow for the City of Dublin Steam Packet Company and launched on 30 December 1903. She was placed on the Liverpool to Dublin service.

In 1917 she was purchased by the Great Eastern Railway and in 1919 renamed SS Frinton. She was then acquired by the London and North Eastern Railway in 1923. She was sold in 1927 to Samos Steam Navigation Company in London and again in 1928 to D Inglessi Fils SA de Navigation, Samos.

She was bombed by Luftwaffe aircraft at Megara during the German invasion of Greece and sunk on 22 April 1941.

References

1903 ships
Steamships of the United Kingdom
Ships built on the River Clyde
Ships of the Great Eastern Railway
Maritime incidents in April 1941
Ships sunk by German aircraft
World War II shipwrecks in the Aegean Sea